James Kilbane (born 14 October 1970) is an Irish Christian country, gospel, and country and Irish singer. Kilbane was the runner up in the second series of RTÉ One's You're A Star in 2004.

Career
Kilbane finished second in the second series of RTÉ One's You're A Star, a competition to select the Irish entrant for the 2004 Eurovision Song Contest. Kilbane ultimately lost out to Chris Doran in the final.

Since 2004, Kilbane has released a number of albums on the Gold Eagle Music label including King of the Road, Close to You, Hymns of Praise, Divine Love, Life's Miracle, Heart to Heart, Glory and Grace, Mary: The Lord's Servant, The Songs of Faith Collection, The Family Collection, Gravel & Grace and Songs of Ireland, as well as a Christmas album titled The Christmas Collection. Kilbane's albums often feature Nashville and Irish collaborations.

In June 2012, Kilbane and his band performed at the 50th International Eucharistic Congress at the RDS Arena in Dublin. Kilbane continues to contribute to other religious events in Ireland, including at Knock. In 2018, Kilbane criticized the selection of Daniel O'Donnell to perform for Pope Francis during his visit to Ireland that year on account of O'Donnell's support for a "yes" vote in Ireland's same-sex marriage referendum in 2015.

Since 2016, Kilbane has hosted Keltic Country Gospel with James Kilbane on the UK digital TV channel Keep It Country.

In 2019, Kilbane was voted as Irish Gospel Singer Of The Year as part of the Irish Entertainment Awards.

Personal life
Kilbane was born in Central Middlesex Hospital, Park Royal, London, England and lived for some of his childhood in Harlesden, North West London. He lives in Achill, Co. Mayo. He married his wife Christina in 1989, they have two children.

He is related to Irish international footballer Kevin Kilbane, and is also related to the Stoke City F.C. and Scotland football player Darren Fletcher, as well as 1912-1923 World Featherweight Champion Johnny Kilbane.

References

External links
 
 
 

Irish gospel singers
Irish country singers
Christian country singers
Irish folk singers
Living people
1970 births
You're a Star contestants
Achill Island
21st-century Irish male  singers